Alhaji Kwabena Frimpong (died 18 October 2005) was a Ghanaian highlife singer. He is known for his hit song "Kyenkyen Bi Adi M'awu", performed by K. Frimpong And His Cubano Fiestas.

In the 1970s, he recorded with two different bands, with overlapping personnel.  One was the Vis-A-Vis band, based in Kumasi and led by Isaac Yeboah.  Their album Obi Agye Me Dofo was released in Ghana on the Probisco record label, and was later reissued on the Makossa International label.  The second band was the Cubano Fiestas, who recorded the album K. Frimpong and His Cubano Fiestas in 1977 for the Ofori Brothers label.  The album contained the track "Kyenkyen Bi Adi M'awu" for which Frimpong is best known.  He recorded at least two other albums with the Cubano Fiestas: Me Da A Onnda (1980), and K Frimpong, both released in Ghana on the Polydor label.

Frimpong died on 18 October 2005 in Komfo Anokye Teaching Hospital, Kumasi, Ghana.

His two sons are rappers named Cabum and Kofi Kapone.

Discography 
Kyenkyen Bi Adi M'awu (1976)
Okwantuni (1995)

References 

Year of birth missing
2005 deaths
Ghanaian musicians